Barbora Krejčíková and Kateřina Siniaková defeated Hsieh Su-wei and Elise Mertens in the final, 6–3, 6–4 to win the doubles tennis title at the 2021 WTA Finals.

Tímea Babos and Kristina Mladenovic were the two-time reigning champions, but failed to qualify this year.

Krejčíková and Siniaková clinched the year-end no. 1 as a team with their win against Sharon Fichman and Giuliana Olmos in their first round-robin match, and Siniaková secured the individual year-end no. 1 ranking by winning the title. Hsieh was also in contention for the top ranking.

Seeds

Alternates

Draw

Finals

Group El Tajín

Group Tenochtitlán

Standings are determined by: 1. number of wins; 2. number of matches; 3. in two-player ties, head-to-head records; 4. in three-player ties, (a) percentage of sets won (head-to-head records if two players remain tied), then (b) percentage of games won (head-to-head records if two players remain tied), then (c) WTA rankings.

References

External links 
 Doubles Draw

Finals
2021 doubles